Ian Fyfe was a cricketer, coach and a sports journalist from Karachi, Pakistan. He was educated at St Patrick's High School, Karachi.

A bowler at St. Patrick's, under the watchful eye of Jacob Harris and as a leading wicket taker for the Karachi Goan Association, he was among the top slow, left arm spinning bowlers of Karachi at that time. He worked as a playing coach for the Karachi Goan Association cricket team. Fyfe enjoyed serving as the Master of Ceremonies at weddings.

Fyfe worked as a senior sports reporter for the Dawn (newspaper) for many years. He had earlier worked at the Morning News during the 1970s.

Fyfe died from heart failure and complications from injuries in the Liaquat National Hospital on 5 August 2005 at age 58. He was on his way home on his scooter on 30 June when a car hit him on Shara-e-Faisal. The funeral service was held at Christ the King Church on 7 August 2005. A memorial was arranged by the Karachi Sports Forum at Karachi Goan Association Gymkhana on 19 August 2005.

Snooker championship 
Eight top snooker players in the country were to take part in the Ian Fyfe Memorial Snooker Championship 2005, a three-day event starting from 19 September 2005 at the Karachi Club. The club is organising the Rs100,000 event in remembrance of the late Ian Fyfe who was a popular sports reporter.

The third Ian Fyfe Memorial Inter-school Twenty20 cricket tournament started on 13 October 2011 at the Karachi Goan Association Gymkhana ground with 10 teams participating.

Legacy
The Ian Fyfe Memorial Inter-school T20 Cricket tournament is still running in 2017, 12 years after Fyfe's demise.

References

External links 
Shore School win Ian Fyfe T20 event - Dawn report

Pakistani Roman Catholics
St. Patrick's High School, Karachi alumni
Pakistani sportswriters
2005 deaths
Year of birth missing
Cricketers from Karachi
Journalists from Karachi
Pakistani sports journalists
Pakistani people of Goan descent
Road incident deaths in Pakistan
Dawn (newspaper) people
Pakistani male journalists